James Lonsdale may refer to:
James Lonsdale (Irish politician) (1865–1921), Unionist member of the British Parliament from Ireland (now Northern Ireland)
James Lonsdale (painter) (1777–1839), fashionable and prolific English portrait painter
James John Lonsdale (1810–1886), English judge, writer and secretary to the Criminal Law Commission 
James Lowther, 1st Earl of Lonsdale (1736–1802), member of the British Parliament from various places in England
James Lowther, 7th Earl of Lonsdale (1922–2006), British peer

See also
James Lonsdale-Bryans (1893–1981), writer, British amateur diplomat and Nazi sympathiser